The WDF World Cup is a major darts tournament organized by the World Darts Federation and has been held biennially since 1977. The tournament has featured men's events since the beginning, while women's events were added in 1983 and youth events in 1999. The 2019 World Cup was held in Cluj-Napoca, Romania. The event used to be broadcast on ITV in the United Kingdom, but coverage of the tournament ceased after the 1987 World Cup.



Tournament structure
Men's national teams participating in the WDF World Cup consist of four players per country, competing as singles, pairs and in a four-player team event. Starting in 2015, women's teams will also consist of four players each and compete in these three types of events, having previously comprised only two players for singles and pairs competitions. Youth teams have been expanded as well and will now include two male and two female players under the age of 18 who compete in their respective singles and pairs competitions as well as a mixed pairs event.

Points are scored depending on placement in the various events, with the national teams achieving the highest points totals being crowned WDF World Cup Champions in the three categories of men, women and youth.

List of tournaments

See also
List of WDF tournaments
List of BDO ranked tournaments

References

External links
 Official site of 2009 World Cup
 Official site of 2005 World Cup
 WDF Official Website

 
Darts tournaments
Recurring sporting events established in 1977
World cups
Biennial sporting events